Prunus subcorymbosa is a species of tree in the family Rosaceae, and is native to montane forests from Costa Rica, Central America, to Venezuela and northern Peru, South America.

References 

subcorymbosa
Trees of Colombia
Trees of Costa Rica
Trees of Ecuador
Trees of Venezuela
Trees of Peru